Bertrude, Countess of Vermandois (c. 582–618 or 619) was a Countess of Vermandois and a Frankish queen consort from 613 to 618. She was married to Chlothar II.

Her origins are uncertain and unconfirmed; however, it is known that the Mayor of the Palace Erchinoald was King Dagobert I’s cousin through his mother, making her the sister of Saint Gerberge and, therefore, a daughter of Richomer and Saint Gertrude of Hamage. Because Chlothar had three wives (Haldetrude, Bertrude, and Sichilde) and it is not known which was mother of his sons Dagobert I and Charibert II, it is not clear this daughter of Richomer was Bertrude. It is also possible Bertrude was a daughter of Wagon II.

According to the Chronique du Pseudo-Frédégaire, Bertrude loved Chlothar sincerely. She was also described as a popular queen. She is reported to have exposed and prevented an attempted plot by the Burgundian Aletheus, who planned to kill Chlothar and force Bertrude to marry him.

Bertrude died during the 35th year of Chlothar II’s reign, in either 618 or 619. Their daughter was called Bertha.

References 

Christian Settipani. Les Ancêtres de Charlemagne, 1989. .

Frankish queens consort
Year of death uncertain
Burials at Saint-Germain-des-Prés (abbey)
7th-century Frankish women
Counts of Vermandois
7th-century Frankish nobility